Streptomyces cellostaticus is a bacterium species from the genus of Streptomyces. Streptomyces cellostaticus produces cellostatin.

See also 
 List of Streptomyces species

References

Further reading

External links
Type strain of Streptomyces cellostaticus at BacDive -  the Bacterial Diversity Metadatabase

cellostaticus
Bacteria described in 1958